Lavasoa-Ambatotsirongorongo Mountains are a mountain chain in southern Madagascar. They are composed of three peaks:
Grand Lavasoa (823 meters or 2700 feet)
Petit Lavasoa (617 meters or 2024 feet)
Ambatotsirongorongo (438 meters or 1437 feet)

The Lavasoa dwarf lemur (Cheirogaleus lavasoensis), a small, nocturnal strepsirrhine primate and a species of lemur was discovered in the 21st century. The primate, endemic to three small, isolated patches of forest on the southern slopes of the Lavasoa Mountains was named after the mountain itself.

References

Mountain ranges of Madagascar